Chooks-to-Go Pilipinas 3x3 is a professional 3-on-3 basketball league in the Philippines and is organized by the country's national basketball federation, the Samahang Basketbol ng Pilipinas (SBP). It was formed in 2018 as a bid to get the Philippines qualify for the 3x3 basketball event in the Summer Olympics.

History
In December 2018, Bounty Agro Ventures the company behind the roast chicken brand Chooks-to-Go, announced that it would be helping establish a 3-on-3 basketball league to be organized by the Samahang Basketbol ng Pilipinas. This followed the inclusion of the 3x3 variant of basketball being included as a medal event in the 2020 Summer Olympics in Tokyo. The organization of a 3x3 league would enable the Philippines to participate in FIBA 3x3 World Tour to accumulate points to qualify for the 3x3 event in the Olympics.

Eric Altamirano was named as the league's first commissioner. The pre-season game was set to commence on January 14, 2019, at the Ynares Sports Arena in Pasig, Metro Manila and the President's Cup, the first conference of the inaugural season was held which consisted of six legs, including a grand final leg.

In March 2019, it was reported that FIBA gave the Chooks-to-Go Pilipinas 3x3 recognition as a Quest level competition which meant that the winner of the President's Cup automatically qualifies for the FIBA 3x3 World Tour. Two more competitions were held for the 2019 season, the Patriot's Cup and the Magiting Cup.

The league attained professional status in July 2020, when it received approval from the Games and Amusement Board. The 2020 season was planned to have three competitions like the previous season but only the President's Cup was held due to the COVID-19 pandemic.

The third season held in October 2021 with a one-day invitational tournament featuring 12 teams. The tournament was won by Manila HeiHei.

Teams

Former teams

Summary

Organization

Player eligibility
For the President's Cup, only Filipino players are eligible to play but Filipinos with foreign heritage are also eligible provided they can prove their lineage. The league adopts the laxer FIBA 3x3 player eligibility meaning that heritage players don't need to have acquired a Philippine passport by age 16, an eligibility requirement for the full 5-a-side basketball. Teams can name up to six players per conference but can only field four players per leg or tournament in a conference. The players need not to be a native of the team's home locality. For the Patriot's Cup each team can field one foreign player.

Broadcasting
Matches of the league in the inaugural season were broadcast by ESPN5. For the 2020–21 season, BEAM TV will broadcast the entirety of the upcoming Chooks-to-Go Pilipinas 3x3 President's Cup.

See also
 SBP Pambansang Tatluhan
 Philippine Basketball Association
 NBL
 Pilipinas Super League
 Filbasket
 Pilipinas VisMin Super Cup

References

 
Basketball leagues in the Philippines
Sports leagues established in 2018
2018 establishments in the Philippines
3x3 basketball competitions in the Philippines
2019 in 3x3 basketball